Lichenoid trikeratosis is a cutaneous condition that may be related to keratosis lichenoides chronica.

See also 
 List of cutaneous conditions

References 

Lichenoid eruptions